Konstanty Zakrzewski (14 January 1876 in Warsaw – 19 January 1948 in Kraków) was a Polish physicist. He was a professor of the Jagiellonian University (1911–1913 and since 1917) and professor of the Lviv University (1913–1917), member of the Polish Academy of Learning (since 1920).

Zakrzewski was a researcher of electron theory of metals, optics, and dielectric properties of substances. He was an initiator of cosmic ray research in Poland (1947).

References
 
 

1876 births
1948 deaths
Scientists from Warsaw
20th-century Polish physicists
Academic staff of the University of Lviv
Academic staff of Jagiellonian University
Cosmic ray physicists